Perling (Jawi: ڤرليڠ, official called Taman Perling) is a neighbourhood and an upcoming state constituency in Pulai, Iskandar Puteri, Johor Bahru District, Johor, Malaysia. The main landmark of the housing area is Perling Mall, which has 2 floor of almost 100 shops. It is located twenty minutes from Johor Bahru.And the iconic building at Taman Perling is Pangsapuri MIDAS with its black and white colour at the peak hill of Taman Perling.

Educations
Sekolah Kebangsaan Taman Perling
Sekolah Kebangsaan Seri Perling (2)
Sekolah Kebangsaan Taman Perling (3)
Sekolah Menengah Kebangsaan Seri Perling
Sekolah Menengah Kebangsaan Dato' Usman Awang
Sekolah Rendah Jenis Kebangsaan(Cina)Pei Hwa
Sekolah Menengah Kebangsaan Bandar Uda Utama

Demographics

Most of Perling's residents are of Chinese descent (47.5%), followed by Malays (39.3%) and Indians (12.7%).

Transportation
The suburb is accessible by Causeway Link route CW3 from Larkin Sentral to Abu Bakar CIQ Complex.

References

Populated places in Johor
Towns and suburbs in Johor Bahru District